Saint Ignatius College Prep is a selective private, coeducational Jesuit college-preparatory school located in the Near West Side neighborhood of Chicago, Illinois. The school was founded in Chicago in 1869 by Fr. Arnold Damen, S.J., a Dutch missionary to the United States.

History

Inception 
In 1836, the Dutch Jesuit Fr. Arnold Damen, S.J. (March 20, 1815, Leur, Netherlands – January 1, 1890, Omaha, Nebraska), was recruited to work with Native Americans in the Dakotas by Fr. Peter De Smet, S.J. In 1844 he was ordained a priest in Missouri. In 1857, Damen was first assigned to Chicago to start a parish for Irish immigrants on Chicago's near-West Side, then an area of the sprawling prairie. The construction of the Holy Family Church was completed in 1860.

The culmination of Father Arnold J. Damen, S.J.'s work in Chicago, the St. Ignatius campus was opened in 1870 as St. Ignatius College. Loyola University originated from this institution but, since 1922, St. Ignatius has operated solely as a college preparatory school. The Second Empire-style edifice is among the oldest in the city, a rare and distinctive example of institutional designs pre-dating the Chicago Fire of 1871.

Admissions

Demographics
The demographic breakdown by race/ethnicity of the 1,373 students enrolled for the 2019–2020 school year was:

Extracurricular activities

Athletics 
Saint Ignatius competes in the Chicago Catholic League (CCL) and the Girls Catholic Athletic Conference (GCAC) and is a member of the Illinois High School Association (IHSA) which governs most sports and competitive activities in the state. The school's teams are stylized as the "Wolfpack".

Notable alumni

Charles Bidwill, owner of the Chicago Cardinals (1933–47); inducted in 1967 into the Pro Football Hall of Fame
Chloe Bennet (2010), actress and singer
Lawrence Biondi (1957), President, St. Louis University
John P. Daley (1965), Cook County Commissioner
William M. Daley (1966), former White House Chief of Staff under Barack Obama and former U.S. Secretary of Commerce (1997–2000)
Richard Driehaus (1960), businessman and philanthropist; namesake of the Driehaus Prize given in architecture
John Joseph Duda (1995), actor
Nnanna Egwu (2011), professional basketball player, former center for Illinois Fighting Illini
Mellody Hobson (1987), Co-CEO of Ariel Investments; also TV correspondent in the field of finance; married to filmmaker George Lucas
Dan Lipinski (1984), former U.S. Representative representing Illinois's 3rd congressional district (2005–2021)
Michael Madigan (1960), former Speaker of the Illinois House of Representatives
John J. McNichols, Illinois state representative and lawyer
Stanley Miarka, Negro league baseball second baseman
John Mulaney (2000), Emmy-winning standup comedian and former writer on Saturday Night Live
Bob Newhart (1947), actor and comedian (Newhart, The Bob Newhart Show)
Jason Steffen (1982), Music Department Chair and Band Director
Todd Stroger (1981), former Cook County Board President
Ed Sweeney, (1905), starting catcher for New York Yankees
Robin Tunney (1990), actress
Michael Wilbon (1976), sports columnist for The Washington Post and host, commentator and analyst for ESPN.

Notable faculty
David Abidor (born 1992), assistant soccer coach, and soccer player

See also
List of Jesuit sites

Notes

References
Directory of Private Schools (2005). Directory of Private Schools: St. Ignatius College Prep
Newbart, Dave. "University Dean Will Lead St. Ignatius," Chicago Tribune, March 31, 1998.

External links

Official St. Ignatius College Prep website
Chicago Landmark website
ForgottenChicago.com's Excellent article about Architectural ornaments in the garden

Catholic schools in Chicago
Educational institutions established in 1869
Jesuit high schools in the United States
Chicago Landmarks
School buildings on the National Register of Historic Places in Chicago
Private high schools in Chicago
Catholic secondary schools in Illinois
1869 establishments in Illinois
School buildings completed in 1870